The 1929 Arizona State–Flagstaff Lumberjacks football team was an American football team that represented Arizona State Teachers College at Flagstaff (now known as Northern Arizona University) as an independent during the 1929 college football season. In their third year under head coach Rudy Lavik, the Lumberjacks compiled a 5–0 record, shut out three of five opponents, and outscored all opponents by a total of 129 to 13.

Schedule

References

Arizona State–Flagstaff
Northern Arizona Lumberjacks football seasons
College football undefeated seasons
Arizona State–Flagstaff Lumberjacks football